Charles Weerts (born 1 March 2001) is a Belgian racing driver who currently competes in the GT World Challenge Europe. On December 8 2022 Weerts was announced as a factory driver for BMW M Motorsport where he'll continue to drive for Team WRT.

Career

Junior formula
Weerts made his single-seater debut in 2017, joining Team Motopark for the 2017 ADAC Formula 4 season, alongside the final three races of the Formula 4 UAE Championship. During the 2017 ADAC F4 season, he would score 22nd in the overall classification and second in the Rookie Championship, scoring just three points towards the drivers' title. The following Formula 4 UAE season, Weerts was crowned series champion, sweeping the final quadruple-header round at Dubai Autodrome en route to a 50-point points lead over second-placed David Schumacher. However, the victory would mark Weerts' final season with Team Motopark, as he would switch to Van Amersfoort Racing for the 2018 ADAC Formula 4 season. After finishing 5th in points, securing one win and four podiums, Weerts would leave the team at the conclusion of the 2018 season.

Sports cars

2019 saw Weerts explore a new discipline of motorsport, joining Belgian Audi Club Team WRT for the 2019 Blancpain GT Series Endurance Cup campaign. After a lackluster 2019 season which saw Weerts' entries score a solitary point across five races, he was paired with Dries Vanthoor for full season campaigns in both series during 2020. After scoring two wins and six podiums in 10 races, Vanthoor and Weerts claimed the Sprint Cup title in the Pro category. Following his title, Weerts was promoted to Audi factory driver status for 2021. He began the team's title defense on a high note, taking pole for the opening race of the weekend at Magny-Cours, before going on to win Saturday's event, further adding a podium finish the following afternoon. Following the fourth round at Brands Hatch, Weerts and Vanthoor successfully defended their Sprint Cup title. In 2022 Weerts, together with Vanthoor were able to clinch a third consecutive Sprint Cup title. They finished the season with 5 wins and 9 podiums in 10 races.

BMW M Factory Driver
At the end of the 2022 season Weerts confirmed he would part ways with Audi Sport and was later announced as a factory BMW M driver from the 2023 season on. He was joined by his current teammate Dries Vanthoor and Team WRT, both making the switch from Audi as well. In his first race as an official BMW factory driver, the 2023 Kyalami 9 Hours, Weerts scored the overall victory alongside Vanthoor and Sheldon van der Linde.

Racing record

Career summary

† As Weerts was a guest driver, he was ineligible to score points.
* Season still in progress.

Complete ADAC Formula 4 Championship results
(key) (Races in bold indicate pole position) (Races in italics indicate fastest lap)

Complete GT World Challenge Europe results

GT World Challenge Europe Endurance Cup

* Season still in progress.

GT World Challenge Europe Sprint Cup

* Season still in progress.

References

External links
Charles Weerts at W Racing Team

2001 births
Living people
Belgian racing drivers
ADAC Formula 4 drivers
Italian F4 Championship drivers
Blancpain Endurance Series drivers
ADAC GT Masters drivers
People from Verviers
Sportspeople from Liège Province
Audi Sport drivers
Motopark Academy drivers
Van Amersfoort Racing drivers
W Racing Team drivers
Karting World Championship drivers
21st-century Belgian people
BMW M drivers
UAE F4 Championship drivers
Le Mans Cup drivers